The 2013 Arab Athletics Championships was the eighteenth edition of the international athletics competition between Arab countries that took place in Doha, Qatar from 21–24 May 2013.

Syria was excluded from the event because of the ongoing civil war and Libya did not send a team. Morocco topped the medals table with eleven gold medals in its total of 22, which it won mainly in the women's section of the competition. Algeria placed second with eight golds among its 19 medals. Bahrain had the greatest medal count overall with 22, and ranked third as it only claimed five golds. Egypt, Qatar and Tunisia each took four gold medals at the competition.

Medal summary

Men

Women

Medal tables

Men

Women

Total

References

18th Arab Championships, Doha (Qatar) 21-24/05/2013. Africa Athle (2013-05-21). Retrieved on 2013-10-07.
"Gulf-Times", 22, 23 and 24 Mary 2013 «PDF archive listing»
The curtain falls on the Arab Athletics Championship . Al Kas (24 May 2013). Retrieved on 2013-10-07.
Morocco wins the Arab Athletics Championships  . IAAF Regional Centre, Le Caire (25 May 2013). Retrieved on 2013-10-07.
Results of the Arab Athletics Championships  . Yahoo Maktoob sport, Le Caire (22 May 2013). Retrieved on 2013-10-07.

Arab Athletics Championships
International athletics competitions hosted by Qatar
Sports competitions in Doha
Arab Athletics Championships
Arab Athletics Championships
21st century in Doha